Havasu National Wildlife Refuge is a U.S. National Wildlife Refuge on the lower Colorado River in Arizona and California.  It preserves habitat for desert bighorn sheep, the endangered southwestern willow flycatcher, and other animals. The refuge protects 30 river miles -  of shoreline - from Needles, California, to Lake Havasu City, Arizona. One of the last remaining natural stretches of the lower Colorado River flows through the  Topock Gorge.

Species
Animal species that inhabit this refuge include peregrine falcon, coyote, fox, desert bighorn sheep, greater roadrunner, bobcat, and cougar. Thousands of bats emerge from historic mines and razorback suckers swim in the back of Beal Lake.

Support
A large river in a dry, hot land attracts wildlife and people like a powerful magnet. Many thousands of visitors annually flock to the refuge to boat through the Topock Gorge, watch waterbirds in Topock Marsh, or hike to the Havasu Wilderness Area.

A non-profit membership organization supports and advocates for the refuge. It assists refuge staff with several of the refuge annual events, help to obtain grants to support refuge projects, conducts fund-raising activities to support environmental education programs, and helps the United States Fish and Wildlife Service operate and maintain the refuge facilities and programs by providing volunteer labor.

Locations

Five Mile Landing
To aid visitors to the Colorado River, The U.S. Fish and Wildlife Service has allowed a private contractor to operate a boat, canoe, campsite, RV site, and a store in the refuge at Five-Mile Landing, a  site with boat ramps at Topock Marsh in the northern part of the refuge.

Topock Marsh

The Topock Marsh is one of the larger birding sites found in the Lower Colorado River Valley, between Hoover Dam and the Colorado River Delta.

Catfish Paradise 
Catfish Paradise is an area located at the southern end of the Topock Marsh. Many species living in the area include Bullfrogs, Carp, Sunfish, Catfish (Channel), Crappie, Largemouth Bass, and Tilapia.

See also
 Sonoran Desert topics index

References

External links

 
 Friends of the Bill Williams River and Havasu National Wildlife Refuges
 Bird Checklist for Havasu National Wildlife Refuge

Lower Colorado River Valley
National Wildlife Refuges in Arizona
National Wildlife Refuges in California
Protected areas of Mohave County, Arizona
Protected areas of San Bernardino County, California
Protected areas of the Colorado Desert
Protected areas of the Mojave Desert
Protected areas of the Sonoran Desert
Protected areas on the Colorado River
Wilderness areas within the Lower Colorado River Valley